Sippy can refer to the following:

People
 G. P. Sippy (1914-2007), Indian film producer
 Ramesh Sippy (born 1947), G. P.'s son and an Indian film director
 Rohan Sippy, Ramesh's son and an Indian film director and producer
 N. C. Sippy (1926-2001), Indian film producer and director
 Raj N. Sippy (born 1948), an Indian film director and producer, son of N. C. Sippy
 Rajan Sippy, an Indian film actor, producer and businessman
 Sippy Grewal, an Indian film producer
 Sippy Pallippuram, an Indian children's story writer
 Cynthia Woodhead (born 1964), nicknamed "Sippy", an American swimmer

See also
 Sippy cup
 Sippy Downs, Queensland
 SIP (disambiguation)